Basail is an upazila of Tangail District in the Division of Dhaka, Bangladesh.

Geography
It has 27481 households and total area 157.78 km2.

Demographics
As of the 2011 Bangladesh census, Basail has a population of 159870. Males constitute 50.97% of the population, and females 49.03%. Basail has an average literacy rate of 50.4% (7+ years).

Administration
Basail Upazila is divided into six union parishads: Basail, Fulki, Habla, Kanchanpur, Kaoaljani, and Kashil. The union parishads are subdivided into 72 mauzas and 107 villages.

Education

According to Banglapedia, Basail Govinda Government High School, founded in 1945, is a notable secondary school.

Pictures

   .    .

See also
Upazilas of Bangladesh
Districts of Bangladesh
Divisions of Bangladesh

References

 
Upazilas of Tangail District